Edmund Michael Hubert Capper  (12 March 1908 – 6 March 1998) was an Anglican bishop Born on 12 March 1908 and educated at St Joseph's Academy, Blackheath and Durham University, he was ordained in 1933. Following a curacy at St Mary Strood he emigrated to Africa where he was a Mission Priest at Luatala with Canon Donald Parsons before promotion to be the Archdeacon of Dar es Salaam then Provost of its cathedral. In 1968, he became Bishop of St Helena, a post he held 1973. He was an assistant bishop of the Diocese in Europe in 1988. He died on 6 March 1998, an honorary assistant bishop in the Diocese of Southwark.

References

1908 births
People educated at St Joseph's Academy, Blackheath
Anglican archdeacons in Africa
Officers of the Order of the British Empire
Provosts of the Anglican Church of Tanzania
Anglican bishops of St Helena
20th-century Anglican Church of Southern Africa bishops
1998 deaths
Alumni of St Augustine's College, Canterbury